"The Serfsons" is the twenty-ninth season season premiere of the American animated television series The Simpsons, and the 619th episode of the series overall. It aired in the United States on Fox on October 1, 2017.

The episode places the citizens of Springfield in a medieval fantasy kingdom called Springfieldia, where the Simpson family are serfs known as the Serfsons. This was the first Simpsons episode to be scored by composing team Bleeding Fingers Music since longtime composer Alf Clausen, who had scored the show since 1990, was dismissed from that position in August 2017. To date, this episode marks the final time that Apu is voiced by series cast member Hank Azaria and is the last dub of Homer's Canadian actor Hubert Gagnon following health issues, resulting in his death on June 7, 2020.

Plot
In the kingdom of Springfieldia, the Serfsons visit Jacqueline Bouvier at The Webs at Giant Spider Acres, a retirement forest, where Marge discovers, to her shock, that Jacqueline is freezing over.

At Barber Hibbert's Surgery, Jacqueline is found with progressive frozen mortification after having been bitten by an ice walker, which converts the victim's flesh to ice in the span of a week. To save her, he proposes a treatment, buying an Amulet of Warmfyre. However the cost for it is too high, and Marge sends Homer to grab the necessary money. Azzlan appears trying to get the Serfsons to convert to Christianity only to be driven away by Marge.

At the Springfieldia Human Power Plant, Homer attempts, unsuccessfully, to ask Lord Montgomery for the money. Seeing her father's plight, Lisa solves the problem by magically converting lead into gold. However, Lisa cannot perform magic in public as then she would be taken by King Quimby and be forced to become one of his evil wizards.

At home, Marge gives the amulet to Jacqueline, who refuses at first, recognizing the futility of life, though she decides to wear it. At that moment, King Quimby's wizards appear and take Lisa away, charging her with witchcraft. To rescue her, Homer rallies the town's peasants into revolt. Upon scaling the castle, the peasants defeat King Quimby's wizards only to face a dragon. Jacqueline decides to remove the amulet, turning her into a human composed of ice, and sacrifice herself to defeat the dragon in which she succeeds. However, it is revealed that the dragon was the source of all magic in the kingdom including all magical creatures. Lisa suggests that the kingdom can now base their lives on science, to everyone's dismay. Homer decides to light coals in an attempt to revive the dragon. This succeeds only for the dragon to burn the village down.

Reception
Dennis Perkins of The A.V. Club gave the episode a B− stating, "’The Serfsons’ is, for what it is, a serviceable goof of an episode whose biggest flaw is its utter disposability, especially as a way to kick off the new season. The show has done a gimmick episode as a season premiere more than once, and they’re perhaps intended to snag viewers with a few unambitious pop culture references. Fair enough. ‘The Serfsons,’ on its own, has a healthy handful of such things, as—dispensing with any framing device or rationale for the fanciful outing—The Simpson family is the downtrodden peasant Serfson family in sort of a 'Game of Thrones', 'Lord of the Rings', 'Dungeons & Dragons' mashup extravaganza."

"The Serfsons" scored a 1.4 rating with a 5 score and was watched by 3.26 million people, making it Fox's second highest rated show of the night.

Brian Kelley was nominated for a Writers Guild of America Award for Outstanding Writing in Animation at the 70th Writers Guild of America Awards for his script to this episode.

References

External links
 

2017 American television episodes
The Simpsons (season 29) episodes